This is a list of civil parishes in England split by ceremonial county (see map below). The civil parish is the lowest level of local government in England.

Unparished areas

In addition to the London Boroughs (except Westminster) and the City of London, the following districts are entirely unparished: 

The following districts only have one or two parishes: 

In contrast, the following districts are entirely parished:

The following districts are entirely parished apart from unpopulated offshore areas:
 Cornwall,
 East Riding of Yorkshire.

See also
 Parish councils in England
 List of the most populous civil parishes in England
 List of civil parishes in Scotland
 List of communities in Wales
 List of community council areas in Scotland
 Parish (ecclesiastical)

External links
 Office for National Statistics : Geographical Area Listings
 Hansard 1997-2000
 Hansard 2000-2005, 
 A Vision of Britain Through Time
 Ordnance Survey : Election Maps
 Census 2001 : Neighbourhood Statistics
 Electoral Commission

Civil parishes in England
Civil parishes
Civil parishes